The Aeromarine Model 60 is a twin engine seaplane design from the Aeromarine aircraft company.

Development
The original 1920 specification called for two 180 hp H-S engines. The sole production model produced in 1923 featured Aeromarine U-8-D engines. The prototype was not flown

Design
The Model 60 is a five-passenger enclosed biplane seaplane with twin pusher engines.

Specifications (Aeromarine Model 60)

References

Flying boats
Aeromarine aircraft
Biplanes
1920s United States civil aircraft
Twin-engined pusher aircraft
Twin-engined piston aircraft